The Lone Wolf is the nickname of the fictional character Michael Lanyard, a jewel thief turned private detective in a series of novels written by Louis Joseph Vance (1879–1933). Many films based on and inspired by the books have been made. The character also appeared briefly on radio and television.

Books

By Louis Joseph Vance
The Lone Wolf (1914)
The False Faces (1918)
Alias The Lone Wolf (1921)
Red Masquerade: Being the Story of The Lone Wolf's Daughter (1921)
The Lone Wolf Returns (1923)
The Lone Wolf's Son (1931)
Encore The Lone Wolf (1933)
The Lone Wolf's Last Prowl (1934)

By Carl W. Smith
The Lone Wolf and the Hidden Empire (1947)

Films

The Lone Wolf (silent, 1917, Bert Lytell)
The False Faces (silent, 1919, Henry B. Walthall)
The Lone Wolf's Daughter (silent, 1919, Bertram Grassby)
The Lone Wolf (silent, 1924, Jack Holt)
The Lone Wolf Returns (silent, 1926, Bert Lytell)
Alias the Lone Wolf (silent, 1927, Bert Lytell)
The Lone Wolf's Daughter (1929, Bert Lytell)
Last of the Lone Wolf (1930, Bert Lytell)
Cheaters at Play (1932, Thomas Meighan)
The Lone Wolf Returns (1935, Melvyn Douglas)
The Lone Wolf in Paris (1938, Francis Lederer)
The Lone Wolf Spy Hunt (1939, Warren William)
The Lone Wolf Strikes (1940, Warren William)
The Lone Wolf Meets a Lady (1940, Warren William)
The Lone Wolf Keeps a Date (1941, Warren William)
The Lone Wolf Takes a Chance (1941, Warren William)
Secrets of the Lone Wolf (1941, Warren William)
Counter-Espionage (1942, Warren William)
One Dangerous Night (1943, Warren William)
Passport to Suez (1943, Warren William)
The Notorious Lone Wolf (1946, Gerald Mohr)
The Lone Wolf in Mexico (1947, Gerald Mohr)
The Lone Wolf in London (1947, Gerald Mohr)
The Lone Wolf and His Lady (1949, Ron Randell)

Eric Blore played Jamison (sometimes spelled "Jameson"), the Lone Wolf's butler and assistant, in eleven of the films, starting with The Lone Wolf Strikes and ending with The Lone Wolf in London.

Radio
The Lone Wolf (1948, Walter Coy/Gerald Mohr, with Jay Novello as Jamison)

TV
The Lone Wolf (aka Streets of Danger, 1954–1955, Louis Hayward)

External links
Michael Lanyard page at the Internet Movie Database
Michael Lanyard, The Lone Wolf
 Lone Wolf books by Louis Joseph Vance at LibriVox (public domain audiobooks)
 

Literary characters introduced in 1914
Fictional private investigators
American crime films
American radio dramas
American crime television series
Crime film series
Film series introduced in 1917